Gonzalo Aníbal Vásquez Pardo (born 11 January 1988 in Chile) is a Chilean former footballer who last played for Lanexang United in Laos.

Career
Vasquez started his senior career with Colo-Colo. In 2011, he signed for Ñublense in the Chilean Primera División, where he made nine appearances and scored zero goals. After that, he played for A.C. Barnechea, Deportes Pintana, and Lanexang United.

Personal life
He is the cousin of the Chile international footballer Arturo Vidal.

After playing in Laos, Vásquez returned to Chile to carry on with his studies and graduated as a Construction Engineer.

References

External links 
 
 Gonzalo Vásquez at playmakerstats.com (English version of ceroacero.es)
 
 
 
 The story of Vidal's cousin who played for Bayer Leverkusen and who is now an engineer 
 Interview: Gonzalo Vazquez

1988 births
Living people
Footballers from Santiago
Chilean footballers
Chilean expatriate footballers
Colo-Colo footballers
Bayer 04 Leverkusen players
Bayer 04 Leverkusen II players
Ñublense footballers
A.C. Barnechea footballers
Municipal La Pintana footballers
Lanexang United F.C. players
Chilean Primera División players
Tercera División de Chile players
Regionalliga players
Primera B de Chile players
Segunda División Profesional de Chile players
Lao Premier League players
Chilean expatriate sportspeople in Germany
Chilean expatriate sportspeople in Laos
Expatriate footballers in Germany
Expatriate footballers in Laos
Association football forwards
Association football midfielders